Brachicheta stricata is a species of fly in the family Tachinidae.

References

Muscomorph flies of Europe
Insects described in 1824
Exoristinae
Taxa named by Johann Wilhelm Meigen